This is a list of Danish Twenty20 International cricketers.

In April 2018, the ICC decided to grant full Twenty20 International (T20I) status to all its members. Therefore, all Twenty20 matches played between Denmark and other ICC members after 1 January 2019 will have T20I status.

This list comprises all members of the Denmark cricket team who have played at least one T20I match. It is initially arranged in the order in which each player won his first Twenty20 cap. Where more than one player won his first Twenty20 cap in the same match, those players are listed alphabetically by surname (according to the name format used by Cricinfo).

Denmark played their first match with T20I status on 16 June 2019 against Jersey during the European Qualifying Finals for the 2019 ICC T20 World Cup Qualifier.

Key

List of players
Statistics are correct as of 4 July 2022.

Notes

References 

Denmark